Zion is an unincorporated community and census-designated place (CDP) in Marion County, South Carolina, United States. It was first listed as a CDP prior to the 2020 census with a population of 136.

The CDP is in northern Marion County, on the southeast side of South Carolina Highway 41, which leads southwest  to Marion, the county seat, and northeast  to Lake View.

Demographics

2020 census

Note: the US Census treats Hispanic/Latino as an ethnic category. This table excludes Latinos from the racial categories and assigns them to a separate category. Hispanics/Latinos can be of any race.

References 

Census-designated places in Marion County, South Carolina
Census-designated places in South Carolina